Meisam Dalkhani (born 5 January 1997 in Shiraz, Iran) is an Iranian Greco-Roman wrestler. He won gold medal in the 63 kg event at the 2021 World Wrestling Championships held in Oslo, Norway. In 2019, he won gold medal in the same event at the U23 World Wrestling Championships held in Budapest, Hungary.

References

External links 
 

Living people
1997 births
People from Shiraz
Iranian male sport wrestlers
Asian Wrestling Championships medalists
World Wrestling Champions
Sportspeople from Fars province
21st-century Iranian people